Sports Stadium Brighton or S. S. Brighton was a former venue at Brighton initially being a swimming pool and subsequently an ice-rink.  It was also known as Brighton Sports Stadium for much of its existence.

History
Sports Stadium Brighton  was a venues that opened as a swimming pool in 1934.  After initial success but a subsequent decline in patronage it was to be repurposed as an ice-rink and rebranded Brighton Sports Stadium in October 1935.  It was also rebranded The Brighton Palladium.  It closed and was demolished  1965.

As an ice-rink the venue was home to the Brighton Tigers ice hockey team.  With the closure of the ice-rink there was surge in popularity of Grice hockey, a grass game  based on ice hockey in the area.

References

Notes

References

Sources
 
 

1934 establishments in England
Indoor ice hockey venues in England
Buildings and structures in Brighton and Hove
Swimming venues in England
Demolished buildings and structures in England